The MAMA Award for Best Female Artist (여자 가수상) is an award presented annually by CJ E&M Pictures (Mnet).

It was first awarded at the 1st Mnet Asian Music Awards ceremony held in 1999; Uhm Jung-hwa won the award for her song "I Don't Know", and it is given in honor of a female artist with the best performance in the music industry.

Winners and nominees

Multiple awards for Best Female Artist
As of 2020, six female artists received two or more awards.

5 wins
 IU

3 wins
 Baek Ji-young

2 wins
 Lee Hyori
 BoA
 Lee Soo-young
 Taeyeon

 Each year is linked to the article about the Mnet Asian Music Awards held that year.

Gallery

See also

 List of music awards honoring women

Notes

References

External links
 Mnet Asian Music Awards official website

MAMA Awards
Music awards honoring women